WQCD (1550 AM) is a commercial alternative rock radio station licensed to serve Delaware, Ohio, locally owned by Brent Casagrande through licensee Delmar Communications, Inc. and operated by WWCD, Ltd. The station primarily serves the Delaware County region and the northern portion of the Columbus metro area as a full-time simulcast of WWCD in Columbus. In addition to a standard analog transmission, WQCD is relayed over analog Delaware translator W225CM (92.9 FM), and is also available online; as WWCD's FM translator W225CS (92.9 FM) also broadcasts on the same frequency, WWCD and WQCD brand as "CD 92.9 FM." The WQCD/WWCD studios are located in Columbus's Brewery District, while the WQCD transmitter is located in Delaware.

The station broadcasts at 5,000 watts during the day and 29 watts at night as a Class D operation, to protect nearby Class-A clear-channel station CBEF Windsor, Ontario.

History
The station signed on the air in October 1960 as WDLR. Initially locally owned through Delaware Broadcasting, Inc., the station was purchased in 1968 by Cardinal Communications Group which was the broadcast arm of tobacco conglomerate R. J. Reynolds. In 1973, it was sold to Radio Delaware Incorporated which was principally owned by James N Shaheen.

In the early 1990s, WDLR was famous among Ohio Wesleyan students for its lunchtime program "TRadio," hosted by Stu Sisk.

In 1997 Radio Delaware sold the station to Fifteen Fifty Corporation which was owned by Patrica Casagrande of Powell, Ohio (FCC Ownership report) and her son Robert G. Casagrande - best known as WCMH helicopter pilot Robb Case - who died in September 2007 at age 50 from cancer.

In Summer 2008, WDLR was acquired by ICS Holdings, Inc., which is owned principally by Mark Litton.

For several years, WDLR was a Spanish language Regional Mexican music format under the branding "La Jefa 1550" and was geared to the Hispanic communities of the greater Columbus area." La Jefa is Spanish for "The Chief" and the name of the branding of a group of similarly related branded format stations, many of which owned by Univision Radio. During this time, the station was also the local affiliate of The Don Cheto Show in morning drive.

In 2014, WDLR flipped from Regional Mexican to a gold-based 1970s/80s AC format under the name "Local 1550". Until recently, WDLR - along with sister station WQTT in Marysville - had derived a portion of its programming from Scott Shannon's The True Oldies Channel from Cumulus Media Networks. After distributor Cumulus Media Networks discontinued The True Oldies Channel in June 2014, WDLR began programming their music format in-house.

Prior to taking back the WDLR calls in July 2007, the station used WXOL after June 9, 2004, and before that also used WDLR. FCC Call Sign History

The former call letters WDLR represent the station's city of license: W Delaware.

ICS Holdings sold WDLR, along with WQTT and WVXG, to Delmar Communications, Inc. effective December 30, 2014. The price for the transaction was $250,000.

WDLR began simulcasting its programming on 92.9 FM in June 2016. The FM signal is transmitted from the same location as the AM towers, off U.S. 36/State Route 37 on the east side of Delaware. On July 15, 2020, WDLR began an additional simulcast on WVKO (now WWCD) and its translator W225CS, both located in Columbus. Weeks later, WDLR adopted a new format and slogan called "My 92.9". The format now includes hits from the 2000's, as well as a different song lineup.During this era, the station broadcast high school football and basketball, along with serving as the Delaware affiliate for the Cleveland Indians Radio Network, and also served as the flagship station for coverage of the annual Little Brown Jug horse racing event. WDLR was a local affiliate for ABC News Radio, ONN Radio and the Ohio Ag Net and carried hourly updates from Fox Sports Radio and localized weather forecasts from WeatherBug.

On September 1, 2020, WDLR and WMYC re-branded as "My 92.9".

On November 21 of that year, WMYC would drop the format to adopt an alternative rock format under the operation of WWCD Limited; at that time, it was similarly announced that WDLR would begin simulcasting the new format of WMYC on January 1, 2021.

The station changed its call sign to WQCD on December 8, 2020.

FM translator

References

External links

FM translator

QCD (AM)
Modern rock radio stations in the United States
Radio stations established in 1961
1961 establishments in Ohio
Alternative rock radio stations in the United States